Alex Padilla (born March 15, 2001) is an American football quarterback who plays college football for SMU. He started his career with the Iowa Hawkeyes before entering the transfer portal in 2022.

Early life and high school career
Padilla was born on March 15, 2001, in Greenwood Village, Colorado. He played high school football at Cherry Creek High School. During his time at Cherry Creek he was a four-year letterman in football and baseball and led the football team to four straight playoff appearances, and finishing as state runner-ups as a senior in 2018. Padilla was 40–12 as a starter, he holds the school's record for touchdown passes in a season with 40 as a junior and holds the record for passing yards in a season with 2,678 also in his junior year. He was named first-team all-conference in his junior year as well as first-team all-state honors. In Padilla's senior year he threw for 1,951 yards and 24 touchdowns, which was good enough to earn first-team all-state honors once again along with being a first-team all-conference player. That year he led the team to a 12–2 (4–1 in 5A Metro East) record only losing against Grandview High School 21–28 in overtime and in the championship game against Valor Christian High School 14–24. Padilla was a three star recruit and he committed to play for the Iowa Hawkeyes on June 14, 2018.

College career

Iowa 
In 2019, Padilla was redshirted and did not see action in any games.

In 2020, he was the backup to Spencer Petras. He saw his first career action in a 49–7 win over Michigan State where he was threw two passes for one completion and twelve yards, along with two rushing attempts for seven yards. He only appeared in one other game against Minnesota in a 35–7 win but did not record any stats.

In 2021, Padilla was once again backing up Petras. He saw significant action against Northwestern after Petras got injured, completing eighteen of 28 pass attempts and had no touchdowns or interceptions in a 17–12 win. Padilla made his first career start against rival Minnesota where he went eleven of 24 for 206 yards and two touchdowns in a 27–22 win. He made his second consecutive start against Illinois going six for seventeen for 83 yards and an interception in a 33–23 victory to improve Iowa's record to 9–2. Padilla made his third and final start of the season against Nebraska, going six for fourteen for 76 yards in the first half before getting pulled in favor of Petras in a 28–21 win, the team's third in a row. He returned back to his back-up role for the team's game against No. 2 Michigan, but did see action after an injury to Petras. Padilla went ten for fifteen for 38 yards and one interception in a 42–3 losing effort to the Wolverines. He did not see playing time in Iowa's 17–29 loss to Kentucky in the 2022 Citrus Bowl. He won the Next Man In Award and was named Academic All-Big Ten.

In 2022, he was named the back-up to Petras. Padilla saw his first action of the season after coming late against Ohio State where he went five for ten for 32 yards and one interception in a 10–54 loss. Ahead of Iowa's game against Northwestern, the team's depth chart showed either Padilla or Petras would start. Petras was decided as the starter prior to the game. On November 29, 2022, Padilla decided to enter the transfer portal.

SMU 
On January 20, 2023, Padilla announced his intention to transfer to SMU.

Statistics

Personal life
Padilla is the son of Alison and Mike Padilla.

References

External links
 Iowa profile

2001 births
Living people
American football quarterbacks
Iowa Hawkeyes football players
Sportspeople from Colorado
Players of American football from Colorado